The Coosawhatchie River (koos-uh-HATCH-ee) is a river in the U.S. state of South Carolina. It rises in Allendale County near the towns of Allendale and Fairfax and accepts drainage from Swallow Savanna, Harters Pond, Little Duck Branch, Duck Branch, Beech Branch (LevyBay), Blood Hill Creek, and Cedar Branch. The channel flows southeast to the Broad River. It is 50 mi/80 km long.

References

External links
 

Rivers of South Carolina
Rivers of Allendale County, South Carolina
Rivers of Jasper County, South Carolina
Rivers of Hampton County, South Carolina